This list of tallest buildings in Monterrey ranks skyscrapers with continuously occupiable floors and a height of at least 115 metres (377 ft) in Monterrey, Mexico and its metropolitan area by height.

Tallest buildings in Monterrey
As of March 2022, this list ranks all 25 buildings which reach a height of 115 metres (377 ft), based on standard height measurement. This includes spires and architectural details but does not include antenna masts. An equal sign (=) following a rank indicates the same height between two or more buildings. The "Year" column indicates the year in which a building was completed.

Tallest under construction and proposed
This lists skyscrapers that are proposed or under construction in Monterrey and are planned to rise at least , but are not yet completed structures. The rank that each building would hold if it were completed is listed. However, its rank is not dependent on any other buildings that are not currently completed.

See also
List of tallest buildings in Mexico City
List of tallest buildings in Tijuana
List of tallest buildings in Mexico
List of tallest buildings in North America
List of tallest buildings in Latin America

References 

Monterrey
tallest buildings